Warner William Westenra, 2nd Baron Rossmore (14 October 1765 – 10 August 1842), was an Anglo-Irish landowner and politician.

Background and education
Westenra was the son of Henry Westenra, Member of Parliament for County Monaghan, by Harriet Murray, daughter of Colonel John Murray, also Member of Parliament for County Monaghan. He was educated at Trinity College, Dublin.

Public life
Westenra was returned to the Irish House of Commons for County Monaghan in August 1800, a seat he held until December of that year, when the Irish Parliament was abolished. He then represented the newly created constituency County Monaghan in the British Parliament until 1801, when he succeeded his maternal aunt's husband General Robert Cuninghame, 1st Baron Rossmore, as 2nd Baron Rossmore according to a special remainder in the letters patent. This was an Irish peerage and did not entitle him to an automatic seat in the House of Lords, although he was forced to resign from his seat in the House of Commons as Irish peers were not allowed to represent Irish constituencies in Parliament. In 1805 he became Custos Rotulorum of County Monaghan, and in 1831 he became the first Lord-Lieutenant of County Monaghan. He held both posts until his death. In 1838 he was created Baron Rossmore, of the County of Monaghan, in the Peerage of the United Kingdom, which gave him a seat in the House of Lords.

Family
Lord Rossmore married firstly Mary Ann Walsh, daughter of Charles Walsh, of Walsh Park, County Tipperary and Sarah Simpson, in 1791, and had three sons:

Henry Robert, 3rd Baron Rossmore (24 Aug 1792 - 1 Dec 1860)
Hon. Richard (21 Feb 1796 - 9 June 1838) married Henrietta, daughter of Henry Owen Scott, on 8 June 1822. They had three known daughters.
Lt.-Col. Hon. John Craven (31 Mar 1798 - 5 Dec 1874)

Their third son, John, represented King's County in Parliament. Lady Rossmore died in August 1807 and Lord Rossmore married secondly Lady Augusta Charteris, daughter of Francis Charteris, Lord Elcho, in 1819. There were no children from this marriage. She died in July 1840. Lord Rossmore died at Rossmore Park, County Monaghan, in August 1842, aged 76, and was succeeded in his titles by his  eldest son, Henry.

References

External links

1792 births
1842 deaths
Barons in the Peerage of Ireland
Barons in the Peerage of the United Kingdom
Irish MPs 1798–1800
Members of the Parliament of the United Kingdom for County Monaghan constituencies (1801–1922)
UK MPs 1801–1802
Rossmore, B2
UK MPs who were granted peerages
Alumni of Trinity College Dublin
Lord-Lieutenants of Monaghan
Members of the Parliament of Ireland (pre-1801) for County Monaghan constituencies
Peers of the United Kingdom created by Queen Victoria